"Who Needs Enemies?" is the third and final single released from The Cooper Temple Clause's debut album, See This Through and Leave. It peaked at number twenty-two on the UK Singles Chart.

Music video
In the video, the band seem to be performing the song fairly calmly in their studio, but suddenly launch into destroying it completely. It collapses at the end.

Track listing

CD1
 Who Needs Enemies?
 Before The Moor
 One Quick Fix

CD2
 Who Needs Enemies?
 Lapitu (Bedtime Story)
 Not Quite Enough

CD3
 Who Needs Enemies?
 Jesus, You Smoke Too
 Who Needs Enemies? (video)

2002 singles
The Cooper Temple Clause songs
2002 songs
Songs with music by Burt Bacharach
Songs with lyrics by Hal David